Until the End of Time may refer to:

Music
 Until the End of Time (Tupac Shakur album), 2001
 "Until the End of Time" (Tupac Shakur song), the title song
 Until the End of Time (Opshop album), 2010
 "Until the End of Time" (Justin Timberlake and Beyoncé song), 2006
 "Until the End of Time" (Electronic song), 1996
 "Until the End of Time", a song by Foreigner from Mr. Moonlight
 "Until the End of Time", a song by Westlife, a B-side of the single "Swear It Again"

Film and television
 Until the End of Time (film), a 2017 Algerian film
 Until the End of Time (telenovela), produced by Nicandro Díaz González for Televisa in 2014

Books
 Until the End of Time, a 2020 book by Brian Greene

See also
 Till the End of Time (disambiguation)